In queueing theory, a discipline within the mathematical theory of probability, a heavy traffic approximation (sometimes heavy traffic limit theorem or diffusion approximation) is the matching of a queueing model with a diffusion process under some limiting conditions on the model's parameters. The first such result was published by John Kingman who showed that when the utilisation parameter of an M/M/1 queue is near 1 a scaled version of the queue length process can be accurately approximated by a reflected Brownian motion.

Heavy traffic condition 
Heavy traffic approximations are typically stated for the process X(t) describing the number of customers in the system at time t. They are arrived at by considering the model under the limiting values of some model parameters and therefore for the result to be finite the model must be rescaled by a factor n, denoted

and the limit of this process is considered as n → ∞.

There are three classes of regime under which such approximations are generally considered.

 The number of servers is fixed and the traffic intensity (utilization) is increased to 1 (from below). The queue length approximation is a reflected Brownian motion.
 Traffic intensity is fixed and the number of servers and arrival rate are increased to infinity. Here the queue length limit converges to the normal distribution.
 A quantity β is fixed where 

with ρ representing the traffic intensity and s the number of servers. Traffic intensity and the number of servers are increased to infinity and the limiting process is a hybrid of the above results. This case, first published by Halfin and Whitt is often known as the Halfin–Whitt regime or quality-and-efficiency-driven (QED) regime.

Results for a G/G/1 queue 
Theorem 1.

For queue  let  denote the random inter-arrival time,   denote the random service time;
let  denote the waiting time in queue for a customer in steady state; 
Let   and 

 

provided that:

(a)  

Heuristic argument
 Waiting time in queue
Let  be the difference between the nth service time and the nth inter-arrival time;
Let  be the waiting time in queue of the nth customer;

Then by definition:

After recursive calculation, we have:

 Random walk

Then we have 

Thus the waiting time in queue of the nth customer  is the supremum of a random walk with a negative drift.

 Brownian motion approximation
Random walk can be approximated by a Brownian motion when the jump sizes approach 0 and the times between the jump approach 0.

We have  and  has independent and stationary increments. Thus the waiting time in queue of the th customer can be approximated by the supremum of a Brownian motion with a negative drift.

 Supremum of Brownian motion 
Theorem 2. Let  be a Brownian motion with drift  and standard deviation  starting at the origin, and let 

if 

otherwise

Conclusion 
  under heavy traffic condition
Thus, the heavy traffic limit theorem (Theorem 1) is heuristically argued. Formal proofs usually follow a different approach which involve characteristic functions.

Example 
Consider an M/G/1 queue with arrival rate , the mean of the service time , and the variance of the service time . What is average waiting time in queue in the steady state?

The exact average waiting time in queue in steady state is given by:
 
The corresponding heavy traffic approximation:  

The relative error of the heavy traffic approximation:  
 
Thus when , we have :

External links
 The G/G/1 queue by Sergey Foss

References

Traffic simulation
Queueing theory